Vernard Hollins (born November 23, 1980) is a former American professional basketball player who last played for Basket-club Boncourt.

References

External links

1980 births
Living people
American expatriate basketball people in Austria
American expatriate basketball people in France
American expatriate basketball people in Germany
American expatriate basketball people in Hungary
American expatriate basketball people in North Macedonia
American expatriate basketball people in Switzerland
Guards (basketball)
KK Rabotnički players
People from Fort Wayne, Indiana
Szolnoki Olaj KK players
Union Neuchâtel Basket players
Wright State Raiders men's basketball players
American men's basketball players